Harold Barry may refer to:

 Harold A. Barry, known as Joe, American polo player
 Harold L. Barry, American polo player